This is an incomplete list of Statutory Instruments of the United Kingdom in 1966.

 Construction (Working Places) Regulations 1966 S.I. 1966/94
 Sheffield Water Order 1966 S.I. 1966/133
 Sweden (Extradition) Order 1966 S.I. 1966/226
 The Road Vehicles (Index Marks) (Amendment) Regulations 1966 S.I. 1966/250
 Settlingstones Mine (Storage Battery Locomotives) Special Regulations 1966 S.I. 1966/351
 London (Heathrow) Airport Noise Insulation Grants Scheme 1966 S.I. 1966/424
 Sweden (Extradition) (Extension) Order 1966 S.I. 1966/811
 Sheffield Water (No. 2) Order 1966 S.I. 1966/1116
 St. Helena (Constitution) Order 1966 S.I. 1966/1458

See also
 List of Statutory Instruments of the United Kingdom

External links
Legislation.gov.uk delivered by the UK National Archive
UK SI's on legislation.gov.uk
UK Draft SI's on legislation.gov.uk

Lists of Statutory Instruments of the United Kingdom
Statutory Instruments